William Douglas "Doug" Smith is a Republican and former member of the South Carolina House of Representatives, representing the 32nd District since 1992, and serving as the Speaker Pro Tempore from 2000 until retirement in 2008.

External links
South Carolina Legislature - Speaker Pro Tempore W. Douglas Smith official SC Legislature website
Project Vote Smart - Representative W. Douglas Smith (SC) profile
Follow the Money - W. Douglas Smith
2006 2004 2002 2000 1998 1996 campaign contributions

1958 births
Living people
Speakers of the South Carolina House of Representatives
Republican Party members of the South Carolina House of Representatives
Politicians from Spartanburg, South Carolina